Milia (also Μηλέα - Milea) is a village in the northern part of the Evros regional unit, Greece. It is in the municipal unit of Trigono. In 2011 its population was 54. It is on the left bank of the river Arda, and on the border with Bulgaria. The nearest larger places are Kyprinos to its east, and Ivaylovgrad (Bulgaria) to its southwest.

Population

History

The village was founded by the Ottoman Turks, and was known as Bektaşlı then. After a brief period of Bulgarian rule between 1913 and 1919, it became part of Greece. As a result its Bulgarian and Turkish population was exchanged with Greek refugees, mainly from today's Turkey.

See also

List of settlements in the Evros regional unit

References

External links
Milia on GTP Travel Pages
 

Populated places in Evros (regional unit)